Fish Lake (also, Murphy Lake) is a teardrop-shaped lake in Marion County, Oregon, United States.  Fish Lake lies at an elevation of 4265 feet (1300 m).  It is in the northern section of the Olallie Scenic Area.  Squirrel Creek flows out of the northern part of this lake.

References

Oregon Fish Finder: Waterbody information

Lakes of Oregon
Lakes of Marion County, Oregon
Mount Hood National Forest
Protected areas of Marion County, Oregon